Koledari Knoll (‘Koledarska Mogila’ \ko-le-'dar-ska mo'gi-la\) is the rocky ridge extending 1 km in north-northwest to south-southeast direction, 320 m wide, and rising to 375 m on Foyn Coast in Graham Land.  It is situated in the north part of Churchill Peninsula, overlooking Adie Inlet to the northeast and Scar Inlet to the southwest.  The feature is named after the Bulgarian folkloric ritual of ‘Koledari.’

Location
British mapping in 1974.

Maps
 British Antarctic Territory: Graham Land.  Scale 1:250000 topographic map.  BAS 250 Series, Sheet SQ 19-20.  London, 1974.
 Antarctic Digital Database (ADD). Scale 1:250000 topographic map of Antarctica. Scientific Committee on Antarctic Research (SCAR). Since 1993, regularly upgraded and updated.

Notes

References
 Koledari Knoll. SCAR Composite Antarctic Gazetteer.
 Bulgarian Antarctic Gazetteer. Antarctic Place-names Commission. (details in Bulgarian, basic data in English)

External links
 Koledari Knoll. Copernix satellite image

Hills of Graham Land
Foyn Coast
Bulgaria and the Antarctic